David Lloyd Moyer is a former American bishop. He was a priest of the Episcopal Church before becoming a bishop of the Anglican Church in America, a Continuing Anglicanism body. After being deposed from the Episcopal Church and denied entry into the Roman Catholic Church as a cleric in 2012, in 2014 he was received as a layman. His former congregation, then known as the Blessed John Henry Newman Catholic Community of Strafford, Pennsylvania, prepared to enter the Personal Ordinariate of the Chair of St. Peter, the North American ordinariate for former Anglicans. The community later merged with a second local Anglican ordinariate group to form St. John the Baptist Catholic Church in Bridgeport, Pennsylvania.

Early life and education
Moyer holds degrees from Whittier College (B.A.), Seabury-Western Theological Seminary (M. Div.), New York Theological Seminary (S.T.M.), and Princeton Theological Seminary (D.Min).

Anglican ministry
Moyer was ordained to the diaconate and priesthood in 1976. After serving parishes in the Dioceses of New York, Albany, and Eastern Newfoundland and Labrador, he became rector of the Church of the Good Shepherd (Rosemont, Pennsylvania) in 1989, a post he held until 2011.

After a public feud with Bishop Charles Bennison, Moyer was deposed by Bennison and charged with having left the Episcopal Church. The deposition was refuted by the then Archbishop of Canterbury, George Carey, and Rowan Williams, Archbishop of Canterbury-Elect. He was accepted into the Diocese of Pittsburgh by Bishop Robert Duncan, but later transferred to the Diocese of the Upper Shire, under the authority of the Archbishop of Central Africa, Bernard Malango. Moyer remained as rector the Church of the Good Shepherd by choice of the congregation. He was consecrated a bishop in the Traditional Anglican Communion (TAC), a Continuing Anglicanism body, on February 16, 2005. He served as the Bishop of the Armed Forces for the Anglican Church in America. He was also the episcopal visitor for the TAC in England and the American commissary of the Diocese of The Murray in Australia.

In 2011, after litigation, Moyer was ordered to leave the premises of Good Shepherd, Rosemont. At that time, a majority of the congregation left with him to form the group that is now part of the Personal Ordinariate of the Chair of Saint Peter. In 2012, his petition to enter the Catholic Church as an ordained minister was accepted by the Vatican (The Congregation of the Doctrine of Faith, i.e. Nulla Osta) but he did not receive local ecclesial approval, the Votum In 2014, he was received into the Roman Catholic Church as a layman.

Personal life
Moyer is married to Rita Moyer (née Hawkins). They are the parents of three grown children and have five grandchildren

References

External links
 St. John the Baptist Catholic Church
 MEDIA RELEASE: New Catholic parish in Philadelphia area
 Personal Ordinariate of the Chair of St. Peter

Living people
American Anglo-Catholics
Anglo-Catholic bishops
Bishops of Continuing Anglicanism
Whittier College alumni
American Roman Catholics
Anglican bishop converts to Roman Catholicism
Year of birth missing (living people)